The International Journal of Cultural Studies is a peer-reviewed academic journal covering cultural studies. The first editor-in-chief was John Hartley (Curtin and Cardiff universities). The journal was established in 1998 and is published six times per year by SAGE Publications. The journal is currently run by chief editor Jonathan Gray (University of Wisconsin-Madison, USA) along with co-editors: Jean Burgess (Queensland University of Technology, Australia); Anthony Fung (The Chinese University of Hong Kong); Paul Frosh (Hebrew University of Jerusalem, Israel); Myria Georgiou (London School of Economics and Political Science, UK) and  Lori Kido Lopez (University of Wisconsin-Madison, USA).

Abstracting and indexing 
The journal is abstracted and indexed in:

According to the Journal Citation Reports, the journal has a 2020 impact factor of 1.862  placing it at position 7/45 in the Web of Science category Cultural Studies.

References

External links 
 

SAGE Publishing academic journals
English-language journals
Cultural journals
Publications established in 1998
Bimonthly journals